Into Battle with the Art of Noise is a 1983 EP by the Art of Noise—its first release, and also the first release by ZTT Records. The record represented the first installment in the ZTT's Incidental Series (catalogue number ZTIS 100).

Into Battle... constructed tracks using early sampling techniques centred on the Fairlight CMI workstation, which at that time represented the state-of-the-art in musical technology.

Reworked tracks

The two key hit tracks from the EP ("Beat Box" and "Moments in Love") were subsequently featured on the group's first LP, Who's Afraid of the Art of Noise?, except for the EP, "Beat Box" was remixed, reconstructed and substantially modified to concentrate more on musical experimentation rather than the raw hip-hop sound of the original. The LP version was designated "Diversion One", while the original EP version of "Beat Box" has since (unofficially) become known as "Diversion Zero."

Reissues
In 1986, Who's Afraid was combined with portions of Into Battle... and the 1985 "Moments in Love" 12-inch single, to form the Daft compilation.

In 2003, the original Into Battle... EP was issued on CD for the first time on a German-only release, but the release inexplicably included "Diversion One" of "Beat Box" in place of "Diversion Zero."

Into Battle... also features as part of disc four of the 2006 Art of Noise boxed set And What Have You Done with My Body, God?. The project was conceived, researched and compiled by music journalist (and Art of Noise aficionado)  Ian Peel – sourced from the original masters – and restored the original version of "Beat Box" and features the 5:10 edit of "Moments in Love" from the cassette issue of the EP, neither track having been officially released on CD before.

In April 2011, Peel continued his archiving of ZTT material, now named the Element Series, with a Deluxe Edition reissue of Into Battle with the Art of Noise. As part of Record Store Day (16 April 2011), this Deluxe Edition was also released as a Limited Edition 2 LP vinyl version: both the original EP and the Worship material LP on 180g blue vinyl, limited to 500 copies worldwide.

Cover art
The artwork depicted on the original EP sleeve is based on that of The Dave Brubeck Quartet's "Time Further Out" (1961), and incorporates a section of the panel "The Knights of Christ" from Jan van Eyck's Ghent Altarpiece.

Parody
The EP's title and elements of its visual and musical style were parodied by the group Mainframe with their 1984 12-inch single, "Into Trouble with the Noise of Art".

Reception

Allmusic reviewer Ned Raggett had positive views on the EP, stating "One listen to into Battle With the Art of Noise and some of the influences in industrial, hip-hop, techno, and pop become clearer."

Track listing
All songs except "Donna" were written by Anne Dudley, Trevor Horn, J.J. Jeczalik, Gary Langan, and Paul Morley.

US/UK Vinyl
Side 1
 "Battle" (0:25)
 "Beat Box" (4:48) (sampled drums played by Alan White of Yes) 
 "The Army Now" (2:02)(sampled vocals performed by The Andrews Sisters)
 "Donna" (1:44) (additional music composed by Gary Langan)

Side 2
 "Moments in Love" (10:15) (Feat. Vocals perf. by Camilla Pilkington)
 "Bright Noise" (0:05)
 "Flesh in Armour" (1:24)
 "Comes and Goes" (1:18)
 "Moment in Love" (1:25)

UK cassette
Side 1
 "Battle" (0:25)
 "Beat Box" (4:48) (Samples "Kool is Back", as perf. by Funk Inc.)(Contains a vocal sample of "Jingle Bells", as performed by Frank Sinatra)
 "The Army Now" (2:02)
 "Donna" (1:44)(Contains a sample of "State of Independence", as perf. by Donna Summer)

Side 2
 "Moments in Love" (5:08)
 "Bright Noise" (0:05)
 "Flesh in Armour" (1:24)
 "Comes and Goes" (1:18)
 "Moment in Love" (1:25)

US cassette
Side 1
 "Battle" (0:25)
 "Beat Box" (4:48)(Contains a vocal sample of "Soweto", as perf. by Malcolm McLaren) 
 "The Army Now" (2:02)(Contains a brief vocal sample of "Boogie Woogie Bugle Boy", as performed by The Andrews Sisters)
 "Donna" (1:44)
 "Beat Box" (a repeat of track 2, 4:48)

Side 2
 "Bright Noise" (0:05)
 "Flesh in Armour" (1:24)
 "Comes and Goes" (1:18)
 "Moments in Love" (10:15)

2011 Deluxe CD/Vinyl Record Store Day Reissue
Into Battle
 "Battle" (0:25)
 "Beat Box" (4:48) (Samples "Kool is Back", as perf. by Funk Inc.)(Contains a vocal sample of "Jingle Bells", as performed by Frank Sinatra)
 "The Army Now" (2:02)
 "Donna" (1:44)(Contains a sample of "State of Independence", as perf. by Donna Summer)
 "Moments in Love" (5:08)
 "Bright Noise" (0:05)
 "Flesh in Armour" (1:24)
 "Comes and Goes" (1:18)
 "Moment in Love" (1:25)

Worship an initial demo of what would ultimately become the Art Of Noise's debut album, Who's Afraid Of The Art Of Noise?, with different track order, extra tracks and alternate mixes.
 "Who's Afraid of the Art of Noise" (2:32) - later appeared on Who's Afraid as 'How To Kill'.
 "One Finger of Love" (0:29)
 "Diversions 1" (7:48) - later appeared on Who's Afraid as 'Beat Box (Diversion One)'.
 "Two Fingers of Love" (0:58)
 "The Uncertainty of Syrup" (1:22) - later remixed and appeared on Who's Afraid as 'Realisation'.
 "Damn It All!" (1:45)
 "Three Fingers of Love" (0:42)
 "Sign of Relief" (1:28) - extended version of 'Snapshot'.
 "Hands off Love" (2:56)
 "Diversions 5" (3:44) - remix of 'Beat Box'.
 "Goodbye, Art of Noise" (0:37)
 "Confession" (0:52)
 "Close (To The Edit)" (4:03)
 "Diversions 3" (3:41) - remix of 'Beat Box'.
 "The Movement of Desire" (3:30) - 'A Time For Fear (Who's Afraid?)' minus final section.
 "And What Have You Done With My Body, God?" (4:41) - extended version of 'Memento', featuring interpolation of J.S. Bach's St Matthew Passion.
 "The Wounds of Wonder" (4:18) - later appeared on Who's Afraid as 'Who's Afraid (Of The Art Of Noise)'.
 "A Time For Fear (Who's Afraid?)" (4:43) - 'A Time For Fear (Who's Afraid?)' minus overlaid voice samples, and with alternate mixing and outro.

References

External links

Art of Noise albums
1983 debut EPs
Albums produced by Trevor Horn
Island Records EPs
ZTT Records EPs